Stigmella corylifoliella is a moth of the family Nepticulidae. It is found in North America in Ohio, New Jersey, Maine, Michigan, Kentucky, California, Pennsylvania, Maryland, North Carolina, Ontario, New Brunswick, Quebec and British Columbia.

The wingspan is 3.5 mm.

The larvae feed on a wide range of plants, including Vaccinium, Corylus (including Corylus americana), Opulaster, Betula, Gaylussacia, Hamamelis virginiana and Alnus rugosa var. americana. They mine the leaves of their host plant.

The Hodges number of this moth is 0092.

References

External links
Nepticulidae of North America
A taxonomic revision of the North American species of Stigmella (Lepidoptera: Nepticulidae)

Nepticulidae
Moths of North America
Moths described in 1861